Lieutenant-General The Honourable Vere Poulett (May 1761-15 March 1812), was a British soldier and politician.

Poulett was a younger son of Vere Poulett, 3rd Earl Poulett, and Mary, daughter of Richard Butt. He was returned to parliament for Bridgewater in 1790, a seat he held until 1796 and again between 1806 and 1807.

Poulett married Anne Lucy (née Becher). They had one son and five daughters. One of their daughters, Anne Lucy Poulett, was the wife of George Nugent-Grenville, 2nd Baron Nugent. Poulett died in March 1812, aged 50.

References

1761 births
1812 deaths
Younger sons of earls
British MPs 1790–1796
British Army generals
Members of the Parliament of Great Britain for English constituencies
Members of the Parliament of the United Kingdom for English constituencies
UK MPs 1806–1807
Vere